18th Avenue is an avenue in Brooklyn. It may refer to the following New York City Subway stations that serve the avenue:

18th Avenue (IND Culver Line); serving the F train
18th Avenue (BMT Sea Beach Line); serving the N train (W train part-time)
18th Avenue (BMT West End Line); serving the D train